Bark&co is a boutique law firm headquartered in the City of London, United Kingdom. Since its inception in 1996 it has been a member of the Specialist Fraud Panel and has grown into a top-tier firm in multiple fields. It has represented defendants in several high-profile cases including the largest ever alleged insider dealing case, the Polly Peck International (formerly a constituent of the FTSE100) thefts, and Ian Edmondson in the News International phone hacking scandal.

Notably, Bark&co are one of a select few firms, along with several Magic Circle firms, that do not include the company type in their name.

Notable cases

Libor Scandal 
Bark&co represented one of six defendants, Noel Cryan, in the Libor scandal. In January 2016 all six defendants were cleared of all charges after a two-year battle and the case banded a "shambles."

News International phone hacking scandal
Bark&co was instructed by Ian Edmondson, former News of The World Editor, in the News International phone hacking scandal.

Murder of Daniel Morgan
Bark & Co represented Glenn Vian, who over the course of nearly twenty years has repeatedly been accused of the highly publicised murder of a private investigator in 1987.  Mr Vian was eventually charged with this offence in 2008, and held on remand for over two years.  The case against Mr Vian was constructed around a number of "supergrass" witnesses" who the defence were, following painstaking work, able to discredit, one by one, until the case ultimately collapsed.  During the course of the case preparation, the defence were able to demonstrate over fifty other suspects and motives which the police, over the course of no less than five investigations, failed to investigate either properly or, in multiple cases, at all.
At the conclusion of the case, Mr Vian wrote to Bark & Co saying:
“My name is Glenn Vian. I have recently been acquitted of murder at the C.C.C. I have been very lucky as I was represented by the best team of solicitors you could possibly find Bark & Co. I cannot say enough about this firm, other than look nowhere else. They are the best. Their investigation team were brilliant.  Thanks to Eamon Harris and Fred Bunn. All of these Solicitors are top drawer: Giles Bark-Jones, Jenny etc. Giles has no problem obtaining the best QCs because of Bark’s reputation and the team behind them. I was again fortunate to get the best QC’s David Whitehouse QC and Ed Gritt QC, absolutely brilliant men. Which brings me to my solicitor Alison Hill, her brilliant legal mind and determination to uncover and get the truth goes above and beyond. So a very special thanks to Alison Hill and Eamon Harris for giving me back the rest of my life. God bless you all at Bark & Co

Glenn Vian”

Murder of Melanie Hall
Bark&co was instructed to represent an alleged suspect in the Murder of Melanie Hall following his arrest in November 2013. Two years later in November 2015, without charge, detectives asked the Crown Prosecution Service for a decision on charging.

Awards and recognitions

ACQ White Collar Crime Firm of the Year 
In 2013 Bark&co were awarded White Collar Crime Firm of the Year by ACQ.

Legal500 Top Tier Firm 
Bark&co have been awarded Top Tier Firm in White Collar Crime for 5 consecutive years by the Legal500.

Chambers and Partners 
Ranked in Band 3 for being a "Solid player in the London market for sophisticated white-collar crime matters including money laundering and civil recovery proceedings."

References

External links 
 Bark&co Solicitors

Law firms based in London